Keelrajakularaman is a village in Rajapalayam Taluk, Virudhunagar District Tamil Nadu, India. This village is situated about 12 km from Rajalapalayam on the way to Alangulam Cement Factory.

Economy
The Irrigation tank situated in this village is the second largest in the Virudhunagar district next to Srivilliputhur.Agriculture is the major occupation carried out by the people residing here.

Facilities
Sub registrar office situated here is the major office after Rajapalayam, Sivakasi and Srivilliputhur. There is a police station also in this village.

Schools 
There is an elementary school with two blocks and a Government Higher Secondary School located in the village.

Adjacent communities

Reference 

Villages in Virudhunagar district